Robert Phelps (born 22 July 1939) is a British modern pentathlete. He competed at the 1964, 1968 and 1972 Summer Olympics.

References

1939 births
Living people
British male modern pentathletes
Olympic modern pentathletes of Great Britain
Modern pentathletes at the 1964 Summer Olympics
Modern pentathletes at the 1968 Summer Olympics
Modern pentathletes at the 1972 Summer Olympics
Sportspeople from Gloucester